Pot of Gold is a budget-priced compilation album by the British hard rock band Rainbow, released in 2002.

Track listing
"Still I'm Sad" (Jim McCarty, Paul Samwell-Smith) - 3:52
"Stargazer" (Ritchie Blackmore, Ronnie James Dio) - 8:25
"Kill the King" (Blackmore, Dio, Cozy Powell) - 4:28
"L.A. Connection" (Blackmore, Dio) - 4:36
"Rainbow Eyes" (Blackmore, Dio) - 7:12
"Since You Been Gone" (Russ Ballard) - 3:14
"Makin' Love" (Blackmore, Roger Glover) - 4:33
"Danger Zone" (Blackmore, Glover) - 4:18
"Vielleicht das Nachste Mal (Maybe Next Time)" (Don Airey, Blackmore) - 3:17
"Eyes of Fire" (Blackmore, Bobby Rondinelli, Joe Lynn Turner) - 6:37
"Stone Cold" (Blackmore, Glover, Turner) - 5:06
"Fire Dance" (Blackmore, Turner, Glover, David Rosenthal) - 4:29
"Fool for the Night" (Blackmore, Turner) - 4:06

References

Rainbow (rock band) compilation albums
2002 compilation albums